This is a list of scholarly, peer-reviewed academic journals focused on the biophysical environment and/or humans' relations with it. Inclusion of journals focused on the built environment is appropriate. Included in this list are journals from a wide variety of interdisciplinary fields including from the environmental sciences, environmental social sciences, environmental humanities, etc.

General
 A\J: Alternatives Journal—published by the Environmental Studies Association of Canada
 Annual Review of Environment and Resources—published by Annual Reviews, Inc.
 eco.mont (Journal on Protected Mountain Areas Research and Management)—established by the Austrian Academy of Sciences, the University of Innsbruck, and other organizations—covering mountain research in protected area 
 Environmental Sciences Europe—published by Springer Science+Business Media
 International Journal of Environmental Research—published by University of Tehran
 Journal of Environmental Engineering—published by the American Society of Civil Engineers

Climate change
Climatic Change—published by Springer Science+Business Media
Global Change Biology—published by Wiley-Blackwell
Nature Climate Change—published by Nature Publishing Group

Energy and renewable energy 

 Advanced Energy Materials—published by Wiley-VCH
 Energies—published by MDPI
Energy & Environment – edited by Sonja Boehmer-Christiansen; published by Multi-Science Publishing, Brentwood, Essex
 Energy and Environmental Science—published by the Royal Society of Chemistry
 Energy Economics—published by Elsevier
 Energy Procedia—published by Elsevier
Energy Research & Social Science—published by Elsevier
 Journal of Renewable and Sustainable Energy—published by the American Institute of Physics
 Renewable Energy-published by Elsevier
 Renewable and Sustainable Energy Reviews—published by Elsevier
 Smart Energy—published by Elsevier
 Solar Energy—published by Elsevier
 Solar Energy Materials and Solar Cells—published by Elsevier
 Wind Energy—published by Wiley

Environmental and energy law 

 Appalachian Natural Resources Law Journal—published at the Appalachian School of Law
 Columbia Journal of Environmental Law—published at Columbia University's School of Law
 University of Denver Water Law Review—published at University of Denver's Sturm College of Law
 Ecology Law Quarterly—published at the UC Berkeley School of Law
 Environmental Law—published at Lewis & Clark Law School
 Environs: Environmental Law and Policy Journal—published at the University of California, Davis School of Law
 Fordham Environmental Law Review (ELR)—published by Fordham University in the United States
 Georgetown International Environmental Law Review—published at Georgetown University Law Center
 Harvard Environmental Law Review—published at Harvard Law School
 Hastings Environmental Law Journal—published at Hastings College of Law
 Journal of Environmental and Sustainability Law—published at the University of Missouri School of Law
 Journal of Environmental Law and Litigation—published at the University of Oregon School of Law
 Journal of Land Use and Environmental Law—published at the Florida State University College of Law
 LSU Journal of Energy Law and Resources—published at the Louisiana State University Paul M. Hebert Law Center
 McGill International Journal of Sustainable Development Law and Policy—published at McGill University
 Michigan Journal of Environmental and Administrative Law—published at the University of Michigan Law School
 Natural Resources Journal—published by the University of New Mexico School of Law
 Oil, Gas and Energy Law—published by Maris B.V., the Netherlands
 Pittsburgh Journal of Environmental and Public Health Law—published at the University of Pittsburgh School of Law
 San Diego Journal of Climate and Energy Law—published at University of San Diego School of Law
 Stanford Environmental Law Journal—published at Stanford Law School
 Tulane Environmental Law Journal—published at Tulane University Law School
 UCLA Journal of Environmental Law and Policy—published at the University of California, Los Angeles School of Law
 Virginia Environmental Law Journal—published at the University of Virginia School of Law

Environmental economics

 American Journal of Agricultural Economics—the official journal of the Agricultural & Applied Economics Association
 Ecological Economics—published by the International Society for Ecological Economics since 1989
 Environmental and Resource Economics—the official journal of the European Association of Environmental and Resource Economists
 Journal of Environmental Economics and Management (JEEM) — published by Elsevier
 Land Economics—published by the University of Wisconsin Press
 Marine Resource Economics—published by the MRE Foundation in affiliation with the North American Association of Fisheries & the International Institute of Fisheries Economics and Trade
 Review of Environmental Economics and Policy—the official "accessible" (meaning more approachable) journal of the Association of Environmental and Resource Economists

Environmental health
 Environmental Health—published by BioMed Central from 2002; open access
 Environmental Health Perspectives—published by US National Institute of Environmental Health Sciences from 1972; open-access
International Journal of Environmental Research and Public Health—published by MDPI in Switzerland
 Journal of Occupational and Environmental Medicine (JOEM)
 Journal of Toxicology and Environmental Health, published by Taylor & Francis
 Toxicology–published by Elsevier since 1973
 Toxicology and Industrial Health—published by SAGE Publications
 Toxicology Mechanisms and Methods—published by Informa Pharmaceutical Science
 Toxicon—published by Elsevier

Environmental humanities 
 Cultural Geographies—published by SAGE Publications
 Environmental Ethics—Editor: Eugene Hargrove, and produced at the Center for Environmental Philosophy at the University of North Texas
Environmental Philosophy—the journal of the International Association for Environmental Philosophy
 Environmental Values—published by White Horse Press, Lancashire, England
 Journal of Interpretation Research—published by the National Association for Interpretation
Journal for the Study of Religion, Nature and Culture—the journal of the International Society for the Study of Religion, Nature and Culture
 Nature+Culture—published by Berghahn Books

Environmental sciences 
 American Journal of Environmental Biology—published by the Academic Block
 Applied and Environmental Microbiology—published by the American Society for Microbiology
 Aquatic Toxicology—published by Elsevier, based in Amsterdam
 Arctic—published by the Arctic Institute of North America
 Carbon Balance and Management—published by BioMed Central
 Chemosphere—published by Elsevier
 Ecological Complexity—published by Elsevier
 Ecology—published by the Ecological Society of America
 Environmental Biology of Fishes—published by Springer Science+Business Media
 Environmental Chemistry—published monthly by CSIRO Publishing
 Environmental Earth Sciences—published by Springer Science+Business Media
 Environmental Research—published by Elsevier
 Environmental Research Letters—based at the University of California, Berkeley
 Environmental Science & Technology—published by the American Chemical Society
 Environmental Science: Processes & Impacts—published monthly by the Royal Society of Chemistry
 Environment International—published by Elsevier
 Frontiers in Ecology and the Environment—published ten times per year on behalf of the Ecological Society of America
 Green Chemistry—published by the Royal Society of Chemistry
 Green Chemistry Letters and Reviews—published by Taylor & Francis
 Journal of Cleaner Production—published by Elsevier
 Journal of Ecology—published bi-monthly on behalf of the British Ecological Society and focused on plant ecology
 Journal of Environmental Management—published by Elsevier
 Journal of the IEST—the official publication of the Institute of Environmental Sciences and Technology

Environmental social sciences 

 Children Youth and Environments Journal—published online by the Children Youth and Environments Center at the University of Colorado
Ecological Economics
Energy Research & Social Science—published by Elsevier
Environment and Behavior—published by SAGE
Environmental Politics—published by Taylor and Francis
Global Environmental Politics—published by the MIT Press
 Journal of Environmental Economics and Management
 Journal of Environmental Psychology—published by Elsevier
 Journal of Political Ecology— published by University of Arizona
 Organization & Environment—edited by J. Alberto Aragon-Correa (University of Granada) and Mark Starik (San Francisco State University), published by SAGE Publications
 Population and Environment — published by Springer Science+Business Media
 Review of Environmental Economics and Policy

See also 
 List of environmental periodicals—includes literary journals, newsletters, popular magazines and more
 List of forestry journals
 List of planning journals
 Lists of environmental publications

External links
 Environment and Society: Scholarly Journals
 Environmental Sciences Journals (JournalSeek)

Journals
Lists of academic journals
Journals